The Roque Saint-Christophe is a big rock formation with Rock shelters (abris sous-roche in French) at the river Vézère, near Peyzac-le-Moustier in the Dordogne. It is located near the route D706 from Les Eyzies-de-Tayac, at Tursac in the Dordogne in Aquitania, France.

Roque Saint-Christophe
Roque Saint-Christophe
Dordogne